Chris Greenman (born 22 December 1968) is an English retired footballer who played as a defender.

References

Since 1888... The Searchable Premiership and Football League Player Database (subscription required)

1968 births
Living people
English footballers
Association football defenders
Premier League players
Coventry City F.C. players
Peterborough United F.C. players
Bromsgrove Rovers F.C. players
Worcester City F.C. players